Atlantea is a genus of butterflies from the Caribbean in the family Nymphalidae.

Species
Listed alphabetically:
Atlantea cryptadia Sommer & Schwartz, 1980 – Hispaniolan checkerspot (Hispaniola)
Atlantea pantoni (Kaye, 1906) – Jamaican checkerspot (Jamaica)
Atlantea perezi (Herrich-Schäffer, 1862) – Cuban checkerspot (Cuba)
Atlantea tulita (Dewitz, 1877) – harlequin butterfly (Puerto Rico)

References

Melitaeini
Butterflies of the Caribbean
Butterflies of Jamaica
Insects of Cuba
Insects of Puerto Rico
Insects of the Dominican Republic
Butterfly genera
Taxa named by Robert P. Higgins